The NASCAR Craftsman Truck Series race at Milwaukee is a race in the NASCAR Craftsman Truck Series that takes place at the Milwaukee Mile in Wisconsin. The race was previously held from the series' first season in 1995 until 2009. The race was removed from the Truck Series schedule in 2010 and it returned to the schedule in 2023.

Past winners

2002 & 2004: Race extended due to a green–white–checker finish.
2009: Race postponed from Friday to Saturday due to rain.

Multiple winners (drivers)

Multiple winners (teams)

Manufacturer wins

References

External links
 

Former NASCAR races
NASCAR Truck Series races
 
Recurring sporting events established in 1995
Recurring sporting events disestablished in 2009
1995 establishments in Wisconsin
2009 disestablishments in Wisconsin